is a Japanese politician of the Democratic Party of Japan, a member of the House of Councillors in the Diet (national legislature). A native of Tōmi, Nagano and graduate of Seijo University, he was elected to the House of Councillors for the first time in 2004 after an unsuccessful run in 2001.

References

External links 
  

|-

 

Members of the House of Councillors (Japan)
1948 births
Living people
Democratic Party of Japan politicians
Seijo University alumni